Richard Dodd (born April 25, 1965) is an English cellist, recording artist and musician.  He has appeared on numerous records beginning from The Three O'Clock's Album Sixteen Tambourines, and spanning different musical genres in Pop, with acts like Jonas Brothers, Vanessa Carlton, The Chicks Taking The Long Way album, Kelly Clarkson, Christina Aguilera and Taylor Swift.  With Rock bands like Foo Fighters, Queens of the Stone Age, and on Aerosmith's album Music From Another Dimension.  Alternative groups: Silversun Pickups, Sam Phillips, Ryan Adams, and Jenny Lewis just to name a few.  British acts Robbie Williams, James Blunt, Snow Patrol, The Last Shadow Puppets, and Paul McCartney's Egypt Station. In Jazz he got to work with Jazz greats Eugene Wright, Al Viola, on the Hadda Brooks album "Time Was When".  Current pop sensation Beyoncé's Lemonade (Beyoncé album).  He appears on the song "I Corinthians 15:15" of Johnny Cash's posthumous album American VI: Ain't No Grave.  He continues to contribute his cello sound to bands like Band of Horses, and artists Weyes Blood, Father John Misty.

Biography 
Richard Dodd was born in Bristol, England. He emigrated with his family from England to the United States at age two to Long Beach, California. He began studying the cello at age ten and took his advanced studies at California State University, Northridge.

Career 
Dodd had an early interest in punk rock. Later as a teenager, he performed live with The Bangles. After studies at Cal State Northridge, he spent many years touring and doing solo sessions with rock artists.

Dodd began working as a session musician in 1983, beginning with The Three O'Clock's album, Sixteen Tambourines where he was joined with his sister Sarah Dodd Falkebring , who is a violinist in the Norrköping Symphony. In 1990 he joined the group Lowen & Navarro; toured and appeared on their albums: Walking On A Wire, Broken Moon and Pendulum.He has since recorded with numerous musical artists such as Foo Fighters, with his velvety grit-to-the-string cello intro on the hit single "The Pretender" of the album Echoes, Silence, Patience, & Grace. Kanye West Graduation and Late Registration, Johnny Cash, Dixie Chicks latest album Taking the Long Way, A Perfect Circle, Dr. Dre.

Richard also appears on the soundtracks to many movies including : I heart huckabees, Knocked up, SAW,
Dodd has also appeared on many TV shows including, The Tonight Show (10 times) David Letterman, Craig Kilborn, Saturday Night Live, American Music Awards, and many more.

He is a member of The Section Quartet, (the world's loudest string quartet) who are signed to Decca Records.

TV appearances

With others
Band Of Horses; Live at the Hollywood Sign "Heartbreak On The 101" (2014)
A Great Big World; The Tonight Show with Jay Leno (2014)

Discography

With others
James Blunt; Back to Bedlam, Atlantic Records (2004)
Dixie Chicks; Taking the Long Way, Columbia Records, (2006)
Honor Society; Fashionably Late, Hollywood Records, (2009)
Robbie Williams; Take the Crown, Island Records, (2012)
Gavin DeGraw; Make a Move, RCA Records, (2013)
Benmont Tench; You Should Be So Lucky, Blue Note Records (2014)

References

External links 
 Richard Dodd Cellist
 The Section Quartet
 Richard Dodd Recording Engineer

Living people
1965 births
Grammy Award winners
Musicians from Bristol
English session musicians